Sheila Margaret Plant (born 19 February 1936) is an English former cricketer who played primarily as a right-handed batter and wicket-keeper. She appeared in 9 Test matches for England between 1960 and 1968. She played domestic cricket for Surrey.

References

External links
 
 

1936 births
Living people
Cricketers from Birmingham, West Midlands
England women Test cricketers
Surrey women cricketers